Arthur Kusterer (14 June 1898 – 23 December 1967) was a German composer and conductor. His best-known work is his opera adaptation of Shakespeare's Twelfth Night.

Life 
Born in Karlsruhe, Kusterer attended from 1913 until 1916 the Badisches Konservatorium there. He worked from 1917 until 1919 as a pianist and répétiteur at the Badisches Staatstheater Karlsruhe. Until 1936, he lived as a freelance composer in his home town and had success on "many German stages" with stage works in the Spieloper genre, such as Was ihr wollt and Diener zweier Herren. On 16 August 1945, at the reopening of the Friedenau Theatre in Rheinstraße in Berlin, Kusterer conducted Rossini's The Barber of Seville. From 1950 until 1958 he was musical director at the Komische Oper Berlin.

Kusterer died in Altensteig.

Works 
 Der kleine Klaus und der große Klaus, opera after Andersen (1927)
 Was ihr wollt, opera after Shakespeare's Twelfth Night (1932 in Dresden)
 Diener zweier Herren, three act opera after Goldoni's The Servant of Two Masters (1936 in Freiburg)
 Katarina, opera (premiere 1939 in Berlin)
 Gloriolus, comic opera in two acts after Miles Gloriosus by Plautus (composed in 1955–61)
 Konzert für Streichorchester (1950, Ludwigsburg Festival)

References

Further reading 
 Joachim Draheim: Arthur Kusterer (1898–1967): Biographie und Werkverzeichnis. Süddeutscher Musikverlag W. Müller, Heidelberg 1983.

External links 

 

20th-century German composers
German conductors (music)
German opera composers
20th-century classical composers
1898 births
1967 deaths
Musicians from Karlsruhe